Patrick W. Morrison (March 12, 1866 – August 12, 1935) was an American lawyer, educator, and politician.

Morrison was born on a farm in Sibley County, Minnesota and went to the Belle Plaine public schools. He went to college in Sauk Centre, Minnesota, read law, and was admitted to the Minnesota bar in 1891. He also taught school in the Carver County, Minnesota schools. Morrison lived with his wife and family in Norwood, Minnesota and continue to practice law. He served as the Carver County Attorney from 1894 to 1902 and also served the Minnesota District Court judge from 1904 to 1917. In the 1902 election, Morrison lost the election for the Republican nomination for the United States Congress. He then served in the Minnesota Senate from 1931 until his death in 1935.

References

1866 births
1935 deaths
People from Carver County, Minnesota
People from Sibley County, Minnesota
Minnesota lawyers
Minnesota state court judges
Republican Party Minnesota state senators
Schoolteachers from Minnesota